Celebrity Family Feud is a broadcast network spin-off of the syndicated American game show Family Feud. Like the primetime All-Star Specials aired during the late 1970s and early 1980s by the show's then-network home ABC, the episodes feature teams of celebrities playing as a 'family' for charity, rather than the regular format of real families playing for cash and prizes.

The current version, outside the one-season summer format on NBC, has aired as a summer series on ABC since 2015, as a part of that network's "Summer Fun & Games" blocks of primetime game shows.

History
The first incarnation of the spin-off was broadcast in 2008 by NBC as part of a block of summer reality series it branded as All-American Summer. Instead of featuring the host of the syndicated version at the time, John O'Hurley (who was hosting the short-lived Secret Talents of the Stars for CBS), the NBC celebrity version was hosted by Al Roker of NBC's morning show Today. This incarnation only lasted for one season before it was cancelled in March 2009. There were six episodes, with the first episode airing on June 24, 2008 and the last episode airing on July 29, 2008.

On April 9, 2015, ABC announced that it had picked up a new incarnation of Celebrity Family Feud, premiering on June 21, 2015 and hosted by Steve Harvey—the current host of the syndicated version of Family Feud. It marked the first time that any version of Family Feud aired on ABC since the end of the original version hosted by Richard Dawson in June 1985. Unlike the current syndicated version of Feud, which was taped in Atlanta, Georgia from 2011 until 2017 and again since 2020, this version has always been produced in Los Angeles, California, and features the return of Burton Richardson, who announced the show from 1999 to 2010, to the series. On August 4, 2016, ABC renewed Celebrity Family Feud for a fourth season. On August 6, 2017, ABC renewed Celebrity Family Feud for a fifth season and premiered on June 10, 2018. On August 7, 2018, ABC renewed Celebrity Family Feud for a sixth season, which premiered on June 9, 2019. On November 20, 2019, the series was renewed for a seventh season which premiered on May 31, 2020. On March 28, 2021, the series was renewed for an eighth season which premiered on June 6, 2021. On April 1, 2022, the series was renewed for a ninth season, which premiered on July 10, 2022. On January 11, 2023, the series was renewed for a tenth season.

Under the terms of Fremantle's agreement with ABC, the network has a strict limit on how many episodes of Celebrity Family Feud it can release each season, so as not to compete against Family Feud's regular run in syndication.

Series overview

Format
During the NBC run of Celebrity Family Feud, each episode featured a tournament format with three games. The winners of the two semi-final games played a final game, with the winner advancing to Fast Money. Due to time constraints, the format was slightly modified from the 2003 format used by the syndicated version, in that the double value round is eliminated, with each match containing two single rounds and a triple round, although the game still played first to 300 points or sudden death. In Fast Money, if one or both team members accrued at least 200 points, the group won $50,000 for their charity; otherwise, $25,000 was awarded to the group's charity if they fail. Families that lost and did not play Fast Money received $10,000 for their charity.

The ABC version does not use a tournament format and follows the same format as the syndicated version. Most episodes feature two self-contained games, each concluding with Fast Money; some episodes in later seasons consist of a single hour-long game. Winning teams earn $25,000 for their chosen charity by scoring 200 points in Fast Money, or $10,000 if they do not; teams that lose the main game earn $5,000 for their charity. On September 12, 2021, both teams, with the Shaughnessy family winning the game, were playing for the same charity so a member of each team played Fast Money for the $25,000 prize. Due to the COVID-19 pandemic, the eighth season used a socially distanced set with individual podiums, which allowed for some teams to have six players instead of the standard five.

International versions

References

External links
  (NBC version/via Internet Archive)
 Official website (ABC version)
 

2008 American television series debuts
2008 American television series endings
2000s American game shows
2010s American game shows
2020s American game shows
2015 American television series debuts
English-language television shows
Family Feud
American Broadcasting Company original programming
NBC original programming
Television series by Fremantle (company)
American television spin-offs
American television series revived after cancellation
Celebrity competitions